Rossellini is a common Italian surname. Other spellings include: Rosselini.

Rossellini may refer to:

 Roberto Rossellini, Italian film director
 Renzo Rossellini, producer, son of Roberto
 Isabella Rossellini, actress, daughter of Roberto
 Elettra Rossellini Wiedemann, American fashion model, daughter of Isabella
 Renzo Rossellini, Italian composer, brother of Roberto

See also
 Rosellini
 Bernardo Rossellino